Sir John Ernley (or Ernle) (1464 – 22 April 1520) was a British justice. He was educated at one of the Inns of Chancery from 1478 to 1480 before being admitted to Gray's Inn. By 1490 he was a particularly conspicuous member of the "Sussex circle" gathered around Edmund Dudley. In his home county of Sussex he maintained a substantial legal practice, serving as feoffee, arbitrator, justice and commissioner, and joining the home assize circuit in 1496 and 1497 as an associate, followed by a position on the county bench in 1498. In the 16th century, he acted as a feoffee for Edmund Dudley, and was appointed Attorney General for England and Wales on 12 July 1507 as a result of his influence with Dudley and, as an extension, Henry VII. He was reappointed when Henry VIII came to power and under him became an important figure in the court. After Sir Robert Rede died in 1519, Ernley was selected to replace him as Lord Chief Justice of the Court of Commons Pleas, and was appointed on 27 January of that year. He served for barely a year, dying on 22 April 1520, and was buried in Sidlesham, near Chichester. He left a son and heir, William Erneley, who also served as a Member of Parliament.

References

1464 births
1520 deaths
People from Chichester
Chief Justices of the Common Pleas
15th-century English judges
16th-century English judges
Attorneys General for England and Wales
Ernle family